Philippe Collin (born 13 July 1946) is a Belgian field hockey player. He competed in the men's tournament at the 1972 Summer Olympics.

References

External links
 

1946 births
Living people
Belgian male field hockey players
Olympic field hockey players of Belgium
Field hockey players at the 1972 Summer Olympics
People from Anderlecht
Field hockey players from Brussels